The 2008 Vale of Glamorgan Council election took place on Thursday 1 May 2008 to elect members of Vale of Glamorgan Council in Wales. This was the same day as other United Kingdom local elections. The previous full council election was in 2004 and the next full elections were on 3 May 2012.

Election result
Forty-seven seats were up for election and the Conservative Party managed to win an overall majority, where previously no party was in overal control. The result took place in the context of Gordon Brown's Labour government falling to its lowest polling since the 1960s, with the Conservatives winning control of eleven other councils in England and Wales.

|}

Ward results

[a] Councillors previously elected as Independent. Llantwit First Independents registered as a new political party in 2007

References

Vale of Glamorgan
2008